Dhanguura is an extinct genus of arthrodire from the Early Devonian of Wee Jasper, NSW. It contains the single species D. johnstoni.

Etymology 
Dhanguura comes from the Aboriginal word "dhanguurr", meaning "fish", in the Wiradjuri tribe's language, because they inhabited the area, west of Wee Jasper. The species name, "johnstoni" is in honor of the discoverer of the genus, Dr. Paul Johnston, who found Dhanguura in 1993.

Description 
Dhanguura is known from fossilized remains of an incomplete skull, the nuchal plate 23 cm in length, and the entire headshield estimated at 40 cm. According to the article cited, Dhanguura probably exceeded the contemporary Taemasosteus in size.

Taxonomy 
Dhanguura was thought to be a member of Homostiidae, according to Young, 2004, but a phylogenetic analyses by Zhu et al. 2015, does not support this, with Dhanguura now considered a basal brachythoracid.

References 

Homostiidae
Arthrodire genera
Fossil taxa described in 1993
Placoderms of Australia